The men's 4 × 400 metres relay event at the 1989 Summer Universiade was held at the Wedaustadion in Duisburg with the final on 29 and 30 August 1989.

Results

Heats

Final

References

Athletics at the 1989 Summer Universiade
1989